Mike Nichols: American Masters is a 2016 documentary film directed by Elaine May about the life of Mike Nichols broadcast on the PBS series American Masters. It is derived from a lengthy interview with Nichols conducted by producer Julian Schlossberg. Brian Lowry of Variety has called it "the last memorable Nichols-May collaboration." Richard Brody said that although it is not a major contribution to May's life's work, it "is nonetheless distinctive in its sparseness, its fixed and almost obsessive concentration on Nichols’s face and voice... [it's] May’s highest tribute to Nichols."

Participants
Mike Nichols
Renata Adler
Emanuel Azenberg
Bob Balaban
Alec Baldwin
Matthew Broderick
James L. Brooks
Stanley Donen
Jules Feiffer
Tom Hanks
Alex Hassilev
Dustin Hoffman
Tony Kushner
Nathan Lane
Frank Langella
Elaine May
Jack Rollins
Neil Simon
Paul Simon
Steven Spielberg
Meryl Streep
Robin Williams

References

External links

American Masters website

2016 television films
2016 films
2016 documentary films
American Masters films
Documentary films about comedy and comedians
Documentary films about film directors and producers
Films directed by Elaine May
2010s English-language films
2010s American films